The Squatter's Daughter may refer to:
 The Squatter's Daughter (play), a 1907 Australian play by Bert Bailey and Edmund Duggan
 The Squatter's Daughter (1910 film), a 1910 Australian silent film based on the play
 The Squatter's Daughter (1933 film), a 1933 Australian film based on the same play
 The Squatter's Daughter (Lambert), a 1924 painting by George Washington Lambert